The Three Revelers Vase, also known as simply the Revelers Vase, is a Greek vase originating from the Archaic Period. Painted around 510 BCE in the red figure pottery style, the Revelers vase was found in an Etruscan tomb in Vulci, Italy. The painting is attributed to Euthymides. Although the vase is in the amphora shape, its purpose is more decorative than functional. The painting itself shows three nude partygoers and Hector arming on the reverse. The work is remarkable because of the early use of foreshortening (3/4 views) as opposed to conventional profile and frontal views. The Revelers Vase currently resides in the Staatliche Antikensammlungen in Münich, Germany.

History
The Revelers Vase, although of Greek origin, was discovered in an Etruscan tomb in Vulci, Italy. This discovery is evidence of the strong interaction between the Greek and Etruscan cultures. The earliest Greek colonies known in Italy date from around 800 BCE near the present day Bay of Naples. Since the 7th century BCE, the Etruscans were in contact with these Greek colonies, and became avid patrons of Greek art. It is due in part to this interaction between the Etruscans and the Greeks that Greek styles of figure design and architecture were transferred into the artistic canon of Rome.

The vase
Euthymides and his contemporaries were known as the Pioneer Group because of their work with the newly discovered red figure style. The Revelers Vase, then, is a product of the early forays into working with red figure technique. Created in the amphora shape, the Revelers Vase was likely created in Athens, the home of Euthymides, and purchased by an Etruscan noble. It was created for aesthetic rather than functional purposes. Approximately 2 feet tall, the black vase is decorated with “red“ floral and geometric motifs on the handles and at the base. These motifs also serve as a frame to the main subject of the work, the three nude revelers.  The men have been drinking. The left-most reveler holds a kantharos, a Greek drinking vessel, and the two outer revelers are dancing merrily. The figures, however, are linked together only by the subject, not by any plot or narrative. It is more likely that the artist created this as a study of various poses of the human figure. 

On the reverse of the Revelers Vase is a depiction of a scene from Homer’s Iliad. The Trojan prince Hector is shown donning his armor before combat. He is watched by his parents, Priam and Hecuba. Greek mythology and party scenes were popular subjects for painting at this time.

Artistic importance
What is notable about the vase is not the subject matter, but rather the way in which it is depicted. Breaking the traditionally rigid frontal postures of contemporary Archaic statues and paintings, the revelers are in dynamic, overlapping postures. The two outer figures stand in active stances, with their legs and hands in motion. As does the middle figure shown in a standing position, with his front to the viewer and his head is looking down over his left breast, as his hands are busy adjusting his armor. The use of foreshortening, although primitive, gives the entire composition a more natural and believable feel. It is perhaps the use of this relatively untried technique that led Euthymides to write on his vase “As never Euphronios [could do!]” as a taunt to his contemporary and rival.

References

4. Robertson, Martin. "The Beginning of Free Painting." A Shorter History of Greek Art. Cambridge [Eng.: Cambridge UP, 1981. 64-65. Print.
5. "Euthymides." Encyclopædia Britannica. Encyclopædia Britannica Online. Encyclopædia Britannica, 2011. Web. 10 Mar. 2011.

External links
http://www.metmuseum.org/toah/hd/vase/hd_vase.htm
http://www.metmuseum.org/toah/hd/angk/hd_angk.htm

6th-century BC works
Archaeological discoveries in Italy
Individual ancient Greek vases
Staatliche Antikensammlungen
Vulci